The list of Università Cattolica del Sacro Cuore people includes notable graduates, professors, and administrators affiliated with Università Cattolica del Sacro Cuore (UCSC).

Business

 Giovanni Bazoli (professor), Intesa Sanpaolo President
 Angelo Caloia (alumnus & professor), Vatican Central Bank President
 Andrea Cardamone (alumnus), Widiba S.p.A.(Banca Monte dei Paschi di Siena) CEO 
 Giacomo Campora (alumnus), Allianz Bank Financial Advisors S.p.A. CEO
 Gianpaolo Marini (alumnus), Rolex S.p.A. CEO
 Pasquale Cannatelli (alumnus), Fininvest CEO
 Gabriele Del Torchio (alumnus), Ducati Motor Holding S.p.A. CEO
 Dino Piero Giarda (alumnus & professor), Banca Popolare Italiana President and  Banco Popolare Vice-President
 Ettore Gotti Tedeschi (alumnus), President of the Institute for Works of Religion
 Siro Lombardini (alumnus & professor), Banca Popolare di Novara President
 Augusto Marietti (alumnus), inventor and technology entrepreneur
 Enrico Mattei (alumnus), ENI Founder and President
 Michele Norsa (alumnus), Salvatore Ferragamo CEO
 Susan Oguya (alumna), businesswoman, designer, and entrepreneur
 Roberto Poli (professor), ENI President
 Claudio Raimondi (alumnus), EBAY General Manager
 Edilio Rusconi (alumnus), Rusconi Editore Founder and President
 Anna Maria Tarantola (alumnus & professor), RAI President
 Nicola Trussardi (alumnus), entrepreneur and fashion designer

Politics

 Angelino Alfano (alumnus), Minister of Justice
 Beniamino Andreatta (alumnus & professor), Minister of Defense
 Renato Balduzzi (professor), Minister of Health
 Gerardo Bianco (alumnus & professor), Partito Popolare Italiano leader
 Michela Vittoria Brambilla (alumnus), Under-Secretary for Tourism
 Ombretta Fumagalli Carulli (alumnus & professor), Minister of Health and founder of the Antimafia committee
 Ciriaco De Mita (alumnus & professor), Prime Minister
 Amintore Fanfani (alumnus & professor), Prime Minister
 Giuseppe Fioroni (alumnus & professor), Minister of Education
 Giovanni Maria Flick (alumnus), Minister for Justice and Constitutional Court President
 Roberto Formigoni (alumnus), Regione Lombardia President
 Maria Pia Garavaglia (alumnus), Minister of Health
 Dino Piero Giarda (professor), Minister for Platform Accomplishment and Relations with Parliament
 Elio Guzzanti (alumnus), Minister of Health
 Michaëlle Jean, Former Governor General of Canada and current Secretary-General of La Francophonie
 Cécile Kyenge (alumnus), Minister of Integration
 Nilde Iotti (alumnus), Parliament President
 Mario Mauro (alumnus), Member of the European Parliament
 Gianfranco Miglio (professor), Constitutionalist
 Filippo Maria Pandolfi (alumnus), Minister of Economy, Minister Agriculture, European Commission Vice-President
 Romano Prodi (alumnus), Prime minister, Democratic Party President, European Commission President
 Lorenzo Ornaghi (alumnus & professor), Minister of Culture
 Oscar Luigi Scalfaro (alumnus), President of the Republic
 Giovanni Spagnolli (alumnus), Parliament President
 Tiziano Treu (alumnus & professor), Minister of Labor, Minister of Transport

Journalism
 Francesco Alberoni (professor), Corriere della Sera journalist & RAI president
 Monica Maggioni (professor), journalist
 Aldo Maria Valli (alumnus), vaticanist
 Vincenzo Mollica (alumnus), journalist and writer
 Benedetta Parodi (alumnus), TV host
 Cristina Parodi (alumnus), television broadcasts
 Irene Pivetti (alumnus), President of Italian Parliament, and television broadcasts
 Alfonso Signorini (alumnus), "TV Sorrisi e Canzoni" and "Chi" editor
 William Willinghton (alumnus & professor), photographer

Medicine and science

 Elio Guzzanti (professor), doctor and Prime Minister of Health
 Ignazio Marino (alumnus & professor), doctor and politician
 Ignacio Matte Blanco (professor), psychiatrist
 Antonello Bonci, Scientific Director of National Institute on Drug Abuse
 Mario Gaudino, Professor of Cardiothoracic Surgery at Weill Cornell Medicine

Intellectuals
 Lodovico Barassi (professor), lawyer
 Roberto Busa (professor), pioneers in the usage of computers for linguistic and literary analysis
 Valerio Massimo Manfredi (professor), archaeologist and writer
 Carla Carli Mazzucato (alumnus), artist
 Giuseppe Pontiggia (alumnus), writer
 Giovanni Reale (alumnus & professor), philosopher
 Giulio Salvadori (professor), literary critic and poet
 Vanni Scheiwiller (alumnus), publisher
 Emanuele Severino (alumnus), philosopher
 Giovanni Testori (alumnus), playwright and literary critic
 David Maria Turoldo (alumnus), poet

Religion
 Adriano Bernareggi (professor), Catholic archbishop
 Julián Carrón (professor), Comunione e Liberazione leader
 Giovanni Colombo (alumnus), Cardinal
 Luigi Giussani (professor), Comunione e Liberazione founder
 Attilio Nicora (alumnus), Cardinal
 Paolo Sardi (alumnus), Cardinal
 Angelo Scola (alumnus), Cardinal

Academics

 Mary Beckinsale (professor), president of SACI
 Michael Cox (professor), international relations scholar
 Marcel Danesi (professor), expert in language and communications
 Pio Fontana (professor), Italian literature
 Joseph Grieco (professor), international relations scholar
 John Ikenberry (professor), theorist of international relations and United States foreign policy
 Orsolina Montevecchi (alumnus & professor), papyrologist
 Luigi Pasinetti (alumnus & professor), economist
 Fausto Terrefranca (professor), musicologist
 Mahmood Sariolghalam (professor), international relations scholar

Film, theater, and television

 Aldo Grasso (alumnus & professor), TV critic of Corriere della Sera
Marta Pozzan (alumnus), actress, model
 Gian Luigi Rondi (alumnus), film director
 Ainett Stephens (alumnus), showgirl
 Silvia Toffanin (alumnus), television host and journalist

Music
 Cristiano Godano (professor), singer
Mira Pratesi Sulpizi (alumnus), composer
 Roberto Vecchioni (alumnus), singer

Athletics
 Simon Barjie (alumnus), Gambian footballer
 Igor Cassina (alumnus), gymnast
 Michela Cerruti (alumnus), racing driver

References 

Università Cattolica del Sacro Cuore